Aconitum lasiostomum is a species of flowering plant in the genus Aconitum, native to Eastern Europe.

References

External links

lasiostomum
Flora of Europe